Ulrike Holmer (born 6 October 1967) is a German sport shooter. She won the Silver medal in the  50 metre rifle three positions in the 1984 Summer Olympics in Los Angeles.

References

1967 births
Living people
German female sport shooters
ISSF rifle shooters
Shooters at the 1984 Summer Olympics
Olympic shooters of West Germany
Olympic silver medalists for West Germany
Olympic medalists in shooting
Medalists at the 1984 Summer Olympics
20th-century German women